The arboreal splayfoot salamander (Chiropterotriton arboreus), or arboreal flat-footed salamander, is a species of salamander in the family Plethodontidae. It is endemic to Mexico where it is only found near its type locality near Tianguistengo in Hidalgo state. It lives in bromeliads. It is threatened by habitat loss (deforestation and fragmentation).

References

Chiropterotriton
Endemic amphibians of Mexico
Taxa named by Edward Harrison Taylor
Amphibians described in 1941
Taxonomy articles created by Polbot
Fauna of the Sierra Madre Oriental